Filip Jícha (born 19 April 1982) is a former Czech handballer. He most recently played for Spanish handball team  FC Barcelona. He also played for the Czech national team. Currently he is the head coach of his former club, German handball team THW Kiel. His biggest success as a coach has been winning the EHF Champions League with THW Kiel in the 2019-2020 season.

Awards
IHF World Handball Player of the Year: 2010

References

1982 births
Living people
Czech male handball players
Czech expatriate sportspeople in Germany
Czech expatriate sportspeople in Spain
THW Kiel players
FC Barcelona Handbol players
Liga ASOBAL players
Sportspeople from Plzeň
Czech handball coaches